Henry Abbott Technical High School, or Abbott Tech, is a technical high school in Danbury, in Connecticut. It is among four high schools within Danbury, which include Danbury High School, Alternative Center for Excellence, and Immaculate High School. Abbott Tech receives students from many nearby towns.

Technologies 

In addition to an academic program leading to a high school diploma, students attending Abbott Tech receive training in one of the following trades and technologies:

Automotive Technology	
Carpentry	
Collision Repair 
Culinary Arts	
Electrical
Graphics Technology	
Hairdressing and Cosmetology
Heating, Ventilation, and Air Conditioning (HVAC)
Health Technology
Mechanical Design and Engineering Technology
Plumbing and Heating
Precision Machining Technology

Renovations 

Renovations to refurbish the academic wing, and add on two new shop wings, along with a new parking lot and sport field, were completed in 2009 at a cost of $57 million. In 2011 Abbott Tech won the third annual Connecticut Light and Power ‘Live Green Win Green’ contest. Abbott Tech beat out 20 other high schools to win $20,000 to fund environmental improvements at the school. In 2012, Abbott Tech was selected as a runner-up for CT light & Power ‘Live Green Win Green’ competition earning a grant of $5000. In May 2014, Abbott Tech students won the Clean Energy Grant by presenting energy-saving solutions for their school at the Connecticut Clean Trades Summit.

Notable alumni
 Joe Lahoud, former Major League Baseball player

References 

Buildings and structures in Danbury, Connecticut
Education in Danbury, Connecticut
Schools in Fairfield County, Connecticut
Public high schools in Connecticut